A myr is a unit of time, one million years, used in astronomy, geology and biology.

Myr or MYR may also refer to:

 Munichi language (ISO 639 language code: myr)
 Malaysian ringgit, currency of Malaysia by ISO 4217 currency code
 Myrtle Beach International Airport (IATA airport code: MYR; ICAO airport code: KMYR), South Carolina, USA
 "Myr" (song), a 2011 song by 'Taake' off the album Noregs vaapen

See also

Myrrh
 
 Mir (disambiguation)